Australian tree fern may refer to any species of tree fern native to Australia, most commonly referring to:

Cyathea australis
Cyathea cooperi, native to New South Wales and Queensland
Dicksonia antarctica, a species of evergreen tree fern